Ozyptila umbraculorum is a crab spider species found in Portugal, Spain and France.

References

External links

umbraculorum
Spiders of Europe
Spiders described in 1932